Kenneth Edward Desmond Carroll (born 22 March 1983) is an Irish cricketer. He was born at Booterstown, Dublin, educated at Oatlands College, Stillorgan, and currently works for the Irish postal service, An Post. He is a right-handed batsman and a right-arm leg break bowler. He currently plays for Railway Union and has represented the Southern XI, Ireland U-23, Ireland A and made his debut for the senior team in 2006.

The Dublin-born player has played in the 2006 European Championships having represented Ireland's Under-23 team in the same tournament earlier in the year, winning the award for Player of the Tournament. He also played in the 2006 EurAsia Cricket Series, but Ireland's A team finished bottom of their group in the competition. Carroll made his World Cup debut against Sri Lanka in Ireland's last 'Super 8's match and also opened the batting against India and South Africa in the recent Future Cup in Belfast.

Carroll has also played for the Ireland men's national field hockey team, winning several caps. He is currently part of the A training squad. Carroll also captained his club side, Railway Union, to a Neville Cup in 2011 and a first Men's Irish Hockey League qualification ever for the club.

External links

1983 births
Irish cricketers
Living people
Ireland One Day International cricketers
Cricketers from County Dublin
Leinster Lightning cricketers
Irish male field hockey players
Railway Union field hockey players
Men's Irish Hockey League players
Ireland international men's field hockey players
People educated at Oatlands College